Mainville is a surname. Notable people with the surname include:

Louis-Pierre Mainville (born 1986), Canadian volleyball player
Pierre Mainville, Canadian politician
Sandrine Mainville (born 1992), Canadian swimmer